Where Sleeplessness Is Rest from Nightmares is the only studio album by the Chicago metalcore band Arma Angelus. It was released December 4, 2001, through Eulogy Recordings.

Track listing
All music composed by Arma Angelus. All lyrics written by Pete Wentz.

Personnel
 Pete Wentz – lead vocals
 Jay Jancetic – lead guitar
 Adam Bishop – rhythm guitar
 Christopher Gutierrez – bass guitar, backing vocals
 Timothy Miller – drums

References

External links
 Where Sleeplessness Is Rest from Nightmares on Last.fm

2001 debut albums
Eulogy Recordings albums
Albums produced by Adam Dutkiewicz
Arma Angelus albums